Big Nate: Flips Out is a realistic fiction novel by American cartoonist Lincoln Peirce. It is based on the comic strip and is the 5th book in the Big Nate novel series. The book was released in 2013. It is aimed at children aged 8 to 12. It was published by HarperCollins Publishers.

Plot
Francis begins to become annoyed with Nate's messiness, and feels that its starting to become a problem. Nate on the other hand feels that Francis is overreacting and that its not as bad as he thinks it is. As the day goes on, the issues with Nate being a slob start to show when his teacher hands back his homework assignment and tells him to redo it, despite that Nate did the homework with Francis. 

After class, Teddy meets them in the hall and they talk about the flaws of the yearbook from the previous year, and Nate convinces them to come with him to the yearbook meeting at the library to make a better book. As they arrive at the meeting, they find out that the yearbook editor is Gina, so Nate nominates Francis as co-editor. Gina is forced to comply with this when Mr. Hickson approves it. Then she pulls Nate over to the side to chew him out for handing a book back in bad condition.

Nate wants to take candids for the yearbook, so he asks Francis to get the camera from Mrs. Godfrey, since she wouldn't trust Nate with the camera. Francis is concerned about the safety of the camera, due to Nate's messy past. Nate and Francis make a secret swear, in which Nate promises to take care of the camera and not let anything happen to it. A run-in with Randy almost ends up with it broken, after he snatches it from Nate and throws it across the school yard. Luckily, Nick Blonsky catches it, but then chews out Nate for playing with school property. 

For the next day, Nate struggles to find candids fitting for the yearbook. He later hears about Gina participating in something that she's terrible at, so he plans to use the camera to get an embarrassing photo of her. When Nate goes to look for the camera in his locker, he can't seem to find it. Francis blows up at Nate for breaking the secret swear and accuses him of losing the camera, while Nate protests that he didn't lose it. Francis increasingly gets upset with Nate and calls him a loser. Before he realizes what he's saying, Nate reveals Francis's biggest secret, being his embarrassing middle name, "Butthurst". After a kick to the butt from Randy, Francis walks away and ends his friendship with Nate as he tries to apologize to Francis.

Afterwards, while Nate was drawing a cartoon before school, he thought that Randy Betancourt was the camera thief. Dee Dee came along and asked about Randy. She wanted to spy on him with Nate, much to Nate's dismay. On the way to school, Dee Dee questions about Nate usually walking to school with Francis instead of her. Nate says that he'll probably never walk to school with Francis again, But Dee Dee comments that all he needs to do is get the camera back and he'll be fine. Then Teddy came and when the trio went to their lockers they heard Francis telling Mrs. Godfrey that he lost the camera.

In order to reinstate his friendship with Francis, Nate Gets hypnotized into being neat by Teddy's Uncle. While he does become neater, it starts to prevent him from enjoying his hobbies.

During lunch, when Nate sees Randy bullying Francis about his middle name again, he loses his temper and attacks Randy. Nate almost wins the fight, but Mrs. Czerwicki intervenes and sends Nate to the principal's office. After a lecture from Principal Nichols, Nate meets with Francis and shows him his clean locker before finding the camera inside. Nick then comes by and laughingly confesses that he stole the camera, which Dee Dee records on her phone, resulting in Nick getting suspended for a week. At Dee Dee's encouragement, Nate and Francis reconcile. When Dee Dee points out to Nate that he is dirty due to his fight with Randy and that he doesn't care, Nate realizes that the fight with Randy un-hypnotized him.

A few days later, at the Trivia Slam, Nate takes the candids. Thanks to Nate's phobia of cats, Nate answers the winning question correctly, and Nate's team beats Gina's team. Francis ultimately ends up deciding that he likes Nate better as a slob.

Characters

These characters appear in the book:

Nate Wright - The main protagonist; a preadolescent boy, known for his large ego and sarcasm.
Teddy Ortiz - Nate's #1A best friend, who is a jokester and known for his skill at Yo mama jokes. The book is less focused on him.
Francis Pope - Nate's #1 best friend, who is known for his high intelligence. He breaks up with Nate in the book, he is bullied by Randy in the book.
Chad Applewhite - Nate's trusty friend, makes a minor appearance in the book, a member of Nate's Triva Slam team.
Dee Dee Holloway - Nate's friend, a member of the doodlers. In the book, she spies in Randy.
Marty Wright - Nate's somewhat clueless father, who plays golf and is known to make horrible food.
Gina Hemphill-Toms - Nate's overachiever nemesis. She is the captain of the Triva Slam team, "Gina's Geniuses".
Randy Betancourt - One of Nate's other rivals; the school bully. In the book, he bullies Francis.
Mrs. Clara Godfrey - Nate's ultimate nemesis; his social studies class teacher.
Mrs. Clarke - Nate's English teacher, hosts the Trivia Slam.
Mr. Staples - Nate's math teacher, in the book. He describes Nate's homework as the "Mona Lisa of bar graphs".
Mr. Galvin - Nate's science teacher.
Ellen Wright - Nate's older sister.
Nick Blonsky - He makes his first major appearance as the main antagonist, stealing the camera in the book.
Uncle Pedro - Teddy's uncle who hypnotizes people. He makes his first appearance in this book.

Reception
The book was rated 4.37 starts on Goodreads. The whole series was listed 117 times in The New York Times Best Seller list, it included Big Nate: Flips Out, along with a few other books in the series at times.

References

2013 American novels
American children's novels
2013 children's books
Big Nate
HarperCollins books